Lac Noir may refer to:

Lac Noir (Vosges), a lake in Alsace, France
Schwarzsee or Lac Noir, a lake in the canton of Fribourg, Switzerland
Lac Noir, ex-USS Guyandot (AOG-16), a gasoline tanker of the United States Navy

See also
Black Lake (disambiguation)